is Japanese pop Hello! Project group Cute's fifth major single, released on April 23, 2008, under the Zetima label. Two version are available: The limited edition (EPCE-5553～4) which includes a bonus DVD and the regular edition (EPCE-5555). The first pressings of the limited and regular editions contain a card with a serial number on it that allow buyer to enter to win tickets to a Fan Club Event. It debuted at number 4 in the Oricon Weekly Singles Chart, remaining in the chart for 4 weeks.

Description 
The song is arranged in the style of Latin pop by Yoshimasa Fujizawa. It features flamenco guitar solos at both intro and ending, with Spanish guitar strumming technique such as rasgueado, and Latin percussion such as timbales and congas at the background throughout the song . The lyrics and melody is written by producer Tsunku.

The selected lead singers for Namida no Iro are Maimi Yajima and Airi Suzuki, the minor singer is Saki Nakajima. It's dance performance designated Maimi Yajima, Airi Suzuki and Saki Nakajima as choreographical centre.

In c/w, Darling I Love you, Yajima receiving one and Suzuki two of the only three solo lines.

Track listing

Charts

References

External links 
 Up-Front Works Discography entries: CD DVD

2008 singles
Japanese-language songs
Cute (Japanese idol group) songs
Songs written by Tsunku
Song recordings produced by Tsunku
Zetima Records singles
2008 songs